The 1990 USA Outdoor Track and Field Championships took place between June 16–19 at Falcon Stadium on the campus of Cerritos College. The portion of the campus where the track lies is in the city of Norwalk, California. The meet was organized by The Athletics Congress.

Results

Men track events

Men field events

Women track events

Women field events

See also
United States Olympic Trials (track and field)

References

 Results from T&FN
 results

USA Outdoor Track and Field Championships
Usa Outdoor Track And Field Championships, 1990
Track and field
Track and field in California
Outdoor Track and Field Championships
Sports competitions in California
Outdoor Track and Field Championships